Acianthera biceps is a species of orchid plant native to Ecuador.

References 

biceps
Flora of Ecuador
Plants described in 1996